Men in the Dark (Swedish: Männen i mörker) is a 1955 Swedish drama film directed by Arne Mattsson and starring Elof Ahrle, Sigge Fürst and Sven Lindberg. It was shot at the Kungsholmen Studios of Nordisk Tonefilm in Stockholm and on location in Dannemora. The film's sets were designed by the art director Bibi Lindström.

Cast
 Elof Ahrle as 	Helge Vilde
 Sigge Fürst as Bertil Lund
 Sven Lindberg as 	Åke Landberg
 Sven Magnusson as 	Valter Stjärna
 Nils Hallberg as Stranger
 Victor Sjöström as 	Gustaf Landberg
 Bengt Eklund as 	Ragnar Tranberg
 Lennart Lindberg as 	Lennart Bergman
 Douglas Håge as 	Kjellander
 John Norrman as 	Hiss-Lasse
 Curt Löwgren as 	Village Idiot 
 Edvin Adolphson as 	Herbert Åslund
 Elsa Prawitz as 	Stina
 Brita Öberg as 	Anna
 Marianne Bengtsson as Karin
 Britta Brunius as 	Britta Lund
 Ulla Holmberg as Ingrid

References

Bibliography 
 Qvist, Per Olov & von Bagh, Peter. Guide to the Cinema of Sweden and Finland. Greenwood Publishing Group, 2000.

External links 
 

1955 films
Swedish drama films
1955 drama films
1950s Swedish-language films
Films directed by Arne Mattsson
Films based on Swedish novels
Swedish black-and-white films
1950s Swedish films